The Portland Trail Blazers are an American professional basketball team based in Portland, Oregon. The Trail Blazers play in the Northwest Division of the Western Conference in the National Basketball Association (NBA). The franchise entered the NBA in 1970. The Trail Blazers sold out 814 consecutive home games from  through , the longest such streak in American professional sports. The team has played their home games at the Moda Center (formerly the Rose Garden) since the 1995–96 NBA season. The Trail Blazers are owned by Jody Allen, and Joe Cronin is their general manager.

There have been 15 head coaches for the Trail Blazers franchise. The franchise's first head coach was Rolland Todd, who coached for two seasons. Jack Ramsay is the franchise's all-time leader for the most regular season games coached (820), and the most regular season game wins (453). Rick Adelman is the franchise's all-time leader for the highest winning percentage in the regular season (.654), playoff games coached (69), and most playoff game wins (36). Ramsay is the only coach to win an NBA championship with the Trail Blazers, in the 1977 NBA Finals. Ramsay and Lenny Wilkens are the only Trail Blazers coaches to be elected into the Basketball Hall of Fame, and were both named one of the top 10 coaches in NBA history. Todd, Stu Inman, Jack McCloskey, Kevin Pritchard, and Kaleb Canales have spent their entire NBA coaching careers with the Trail Blazers. Canales was named interim coach of the Trail Blazers toward the end of the  season. Terry Stotts was named as head coach on August 7, 2012. The announcement was made by General Manager Neil Olshey. At this time, his NBA coaching record was 115-168.

Key

Coaches

Notes
 A running total of the number of coaches of the Trail Blazers. Thus, any coach who has two or more separate terms as head coach is only counted once.
 Each year is linked to an article about that particular NBA season.

References
General

Specific

Lists of National Basketball Association head coaches by team

Head coaches